Łukaszowice  is a village in the administrative district of Gmina Siechnice, within Wrocław County, Lower Silesian Voivodeship, in south-western Poland. Prior to 1945 it was in Germany and was named Groß-Grunau. 
The castle was built by the family "von Wallenberg" and the last German owner was Gottfried von Lieres.

The village has a population of 210.

References

Villages in Wrocław County